Janine Maulet is a Swiss retired slalom canoeist who competed in the late 1940s. She won a silver medal in the folding K-1 team event at the 1949 ICF Canoe Slalom World Championships in Geneva.

References

Swiss female canoeists
Possibly living people
Year of birth missing
Medalists at the ICF Canoe Slalom World Championships